Chris Wyatt is the name of:

Chris Wyatt (media executive) (born 1957), English-American corporate executive, primarily in film and television
Chris Wyatt (producer) (born 1975), American film producer, writer and second unit director
Chris Wyatt (rugby union) (born 1973), Welsh rugby union footballer
Chris Wyatt (born 1969), American television producer and internet executive, founded website Godtube

See also
Wyatt (name)